Jonathan Toledo Paragarino (born 10 January 1996) is a Uruguayan footballer who plays as a defender for Fénix.

Career

After playing for the youth academy of Uruguayan top flight side River Plate (Montevideo), Toledo signed for Albion in the Uruguayan third division.

Before the 2019, season, he signed for Uruguayan top flight club Fénix.

References

External links
 
 

Uruguayan footballers
Living people
1996 births
Centro Atlético Fénix players
Albion F.C. players
Uruguayan Segunda División players
Uruguayan Primera División players
Footballers from Montevideo
Association football defenders